Oostrozebeke is a municipality located in the Belgian province of West Flanders. The municipality comprises only the town of Oostrozebeke proper. On January 1, 2018 Oostrozebeke had a total population of 7,849. The total area is 16.62 km² which gives a population density of 472 inhabitants per km².

References

External links

Official website  - Available only in Dutch

Municipalities of West Flanders